Baron Daryngton, of Witley in the County of Surrey, was a title in the Peerage of the United Kingdom. It was created on 12 February 1923 for Herbert Pike Pease, who had previously represented Darlington in Parliament as a Liberal Unionist. He was the younger son of Arthur Pease and the younger brother of Sir Arthur Pease, 1st Baronet, while Sir Joseph Pease, 1st Baronet, was his uncle and Jack Pease, 1st Baron Gainford, his first cousin. The peerage became extinct on the death of his son, the 2nd Baron, in 1994.

Barons Daryngton (1923)
Herbert Pike Pease, 1st Baron Daryngton (1867–1949)
Jocelyn Arthur Pease, 2nd Baron Daryngton (1908–1994)

See also
 Pease Baronets
 Baron Gainford
 Pease family of Darlington

References

 Kidd, Charles, Williamson, David (editors). Debrett's Peerage and Baronetage (1990 edition). New York: St Martin's Press, 1990.
 

Extinct baronies in the Peerage of the United Kingdom
Pease family
Noble titles created in 1923
Noble titles created for UK MPs